The Intergovernmental Science-Policy Platform on Biodiversity and Ecosystem Services (IPBES) is an intergovernmental organization established to improve the interface between science and policy on issues of biodiversity and ecosystem services. It is intended to serve a similar role to the Intergovernmental Panel on Climate Change.

Establishment and early development
In 2010 a resolution by the 65th session of the United Nations General Assembly urged the United Nations Environment Programme to convene a plenary meeting to establish the IPBES. In 2013 an initial conceptual framework was adopted for the prospective IPBES plenary.

From 29 April to 4 May 2019, representatives of the 132 IPBES members met in Paris, France, to receive the IPBES's full report and adopted a summary of it for policymakers. On 6 May 2019, the 40-page summary was released.

2020 report
On October 29, 2020 the organization issued a preliminary report through Zenodo on its workshop, held virtually on 27–31 July 2020, that proposes a plan for international cooperation to lower risks for pandemics. Lowering the frequency and severity of pandemics through implementation of worldwide policies is the objective of the organization. An article on the report was published by Medical News Today on November 7, 2020, that explicates information in the report.

2021 report with IPCC 
In June of 2021, IPBES and IPCC released a co-sponsored workshop report on biodiversity and climate change. The workshop produced a summary report covering outcomes and a 250 page scientific outcome report.

Awards

Gulbenkian Prize for Humanity in 2022

In October 2022, the IPBES and the IPCC shared the Gulbenkian Prize for Humanity, because the two intergovernmental organisations "produce scientific knowledge, alert society, and inform decision-makers to make better choices for combatting climate change and the loss of biodiversity".

See also 
 Convention on Biological Diversity
 Intergovernmental Panel on Climate Change
 System of Integrated Environmental and Economic Accounting

References

External links 
ipbes.net
Summary for Policymakers, of the Global Assessment Report on Biodiversity and Ecosystem Services
 IPBES. (2019). Global Assessment Report on Biodiversity and Ecosystem Services. (E. S. Brondizio, J. Settele, S. Díaz, & H. T. Ngo, Eds.). IPBES Secretariat.

Biodiversity
Nature conservation organisations based in Europe
Environmental agencies
Environmental organizations established in 2012
Intergovernmental environmental organizations
Organisations based in Bonn
United Nations Environment Programme
Environmental organisations based in Germany